Mavis Parrott Kelsey Sr. (October 7, 1912 – November 12, 2013) was an American internist and one of the founders of the Kelsey-Seybold Clinic in 1949, now a large, multi-specialty clinic system located in the metro area of Houston, Texas. Kelsey received his Bachelor of Science degree from the Agricultural and Mechanical College of Texas (now Texas A&M University) in 1932. He attended medical school at the University of Texas Medical Branch in Galveston receiving his Doctor of Medicine degree in 1936.

References

External links 
 Kelsey, Dr. Mavis and Joseph Pratt. Dr. Mavis Kelsey Oral History, Houston Oral History Project, November 2, 2007.

American centenarians
Men centenarians
Physicians from Texas
Texas A&M University alumni
University of Texas Medical Branch alumni
1912 births
2013 deaths